Ro-11 may refer to:

, an Imperial Japanese Navy submarine in commission from 1919 to 1932
Ro-11-class submarine, an alternative name for the Kaichū I subclass of the Japanese Kaichū type submarine